The 2019 Tennessee Volunteers baseball team represented the University of Tennessee in the 2019 NCAA Division I baseball season. The Volunteers played their home games at Lindsey Nelson Stadium.

Preseason

SEC media poll
The SEC media poll was released on February 7, 2019, with the Volunteers predicted to finish in fifth place in the Eastern Division.

Personnel

Coaching staff

Roster

Schedule and results

Schedule Source:
*Rankings are based on the team's current ranking in the D1Baseball poll.

Chapel Hill Regional

Record vs. conference opponents

Rankings

2019 MLB draft

References

Tennessee
Tennessee Volunteers baseball seasons
Tennessee Volunteers baseball
Tennessee